Lymphocyte function-associated antigen (LFA) may refer to:

 LFA-1
 CD2, LFA-2
 CD58, LFA-3